Barisoa is a genus of moths of the family Crambidae. It contains only one species, Barisoa intentalis, which is found in Jamaica.

References

Musotiminae
Crambidae genera
Monotypic moth genera
Taxa named by Heinrich Benno Möschler